Stan Denski (born August 26, 1953) is an American writer, scholar, critic whose work has focused upon both critical pedagogy and popular culture.  His research is divided between the application of critical education theory to university media programs and the study of contemporary popular music and society.

Born Stanislaw Dzieniszewski in Philadelphia, Pennsylvania (the family name was changed in the early 1950s), Denski attended Father Judge High School. He graduated from Clarion University of Pennsylvania with B.S. and M.S. degrees in Communication.  In the mid-1970s he was a staff video producer and director producing instructional television programming for Southern West Virginia Community and Technical College in Logan and Williamson, WV.  In 1990 he received his Ph.D. in Mass Communication (with minors in philosophy and film) jointly from the School of Telecommunications and the Scripps Howard School of Journalism at Ohio University.

In 1986-1987 Denski was a visiting lecturer in Media Studies at The College of Wooster in Wooster, OH.  From 1987-1990, he was resident lecturer in Media Studies in the Department of Communication Studies at Indiana University-Purdue University at Indianapolis.  From 1990 until 1997 he was Assistant Professor of Media Studies and Director of the Telecommunication Program at IUPUI. In 1993 he was awarded the N.E.T. (National Excellence in Teaching) Grant for $6,000 award to design the course, Introduction to Communication Studies.

In February 1994, he was selected to attend the IRTS International Radio & Television Society) Faculty/Industry Seminar in New York City where his design group won the $1,000 prize for best program design. In May 1995 he was an Invited Visiting Scholar at Ohio University in Athens, OH and presented a series of lectures to Mass Communication faculty and doctoral students.

His published works include the book,  Media Education and the (Re)production of Culture (1994, with David Sholle) and numerous journal articles and book chapters. He currently sits on the Advisory Board of the journal Popular Music & Society.

In 1993 he founded Aether Records, an Indiana-based record label that released both vinyl reissues of rare rock records from the 1960s and 1970s and music by contemporary bands on CD and LP.  In 1996, Aether/OR Music became a wholesale distribution and retail mail order company with warehouse and offices based in Indianapolis, IN.  In 1997 Denski left his academic position to take the position of President of Aether/OR Music which he held until February 2002.

As writer on popular music, Denski has written liner notes for numerous LPs and CDs (including the notes for all 10 volumes of the compilation series, Love, Peace & Poetry), his music writing has been published in the Dallas Observer, the Cleveland Scene, Patrick Lundborg's Acid Archives, and he was a contributing critic to the  2007 Village Voice Pazz & Jop Poll.

Denski is also a musician, recording artist and producer, working with artists like Jello Biafra and Nick Saloman. In 1997 he formed the band Many Bright Things, releasing three albums between 1996 and 2005 in addition to one album under the name In The Summer Of The Mushroom Honey in 1998.  In 2002 he produced the compilation album, Pull Up the Paisley Covers: A Psychedelic Omnibus.

In 2007 and 2008 Denski was employed as the researcher and ghost writer for Think Secure, the online blog of Frank DeFina, then president of Panasonic Systems Solutions America.

Since 2007 Denski has maintained his own blog, These Things Too, featuring new writing on music, politics and the arts.

References

 Media Education and the (Re)Production of Culture. Westport, CT: Bergin & Garvey, Inc. (With David Sholle) 1994. 
 "Building Bridges: Critical Pedagogy & Media Studies." Journal of Communication       Inquiry, 18:2, Summer 1994, pp. 65–77.
 "Critical Pedagogy and Media Production: The Theory & Practice of the Video Documentary." Journal of Film & Video, 43:3, Fall 1991, pp. 3–18.
 "Inarticulate Speech of the Heart: Music, Musicians, and Communication." Popular Music & Society, 15:3, Fall 1991, pp. 11–30.
 "One Step Up and Two Steps Back: A Heuristic Model for Popular Music and Communication Research." Popular Music and Society, 13:1, Spring 1989, pp. 9–21
 "Asking Questions: Toward the Identification of Key Theoretical   Issues in Popular Music and Communication Research." With David Sholle. Tracking: Popular Music Studies, 2:1, 1989, pp. 11–25.
 "Critical Media Literacy: Reading, Remapping, Rewriting." With David Sholle. In, A Critical Pedagogy of Representation: Rethinking Media Literacy, P. McLaren, R. Hammer, D. Sholle, and S. Reilly. NY, NY: Peter Lang Publishing, Inc., 1995. 
 "Reading & Writing the Media: Critical Media Literacy and Postmodernism." With David Sholle. In, Critical Literacy: Politics, Praxis and the Postmodern, C. Lankshear and P. McLaren (Eds.). State University of New York Press, 1993, pp. 297–323. 
 "Metal Men & Glamour Boys: Gender Performance in Heavy Metal." With David Sholle. In, Men, Masculinity, and the Media, S. Craig (Ed.). Newberry Park, CA: SAGE Publications, 1992, pp. 41–61. 
 "Music, Musicians, and Communication: The Personal Voice in a Common Language." In, Popular Music and Communication, 2nd Ed., J. Lull (Ed.).  Newberry Park, CA: SAGE Publications, 1992, pp. 33–48. 
 "Critical Pedagogy and Media Studies: A Perspective for the Liberal Arts." In, Working Papers: Colloquium on Communication Studies and the Liberal Arts. Roanoke, VA: Hollins College, 1990, pp. 76–102.

1953 births
Living people
American male writers
American male bloggers
American bloggers
Writers from Philadelphia
Clarion University of Pennsylvania alumni
Ohio University alumni